Maximo Torero (born 27 May 1967) is a Peruvian economist. He is currently the chief economist and assistant director general for the Economic and Social Development Department at the Food and Agriculture Organization of the United Nations (FAO) in Rome, Italy.

Education and career 
Torero earned his B.S. from University of the Pacific (Peru). He earned his MA (1993) and Ph.D. (1998) in economics from the University of California, Los Angeles (UCLA).

He worked as a senior researcher and a member of the executive committee at Group of Analysis for Development (GRADE) in Peru before joining the International Food Policy Research Institute (IFPRI) in Washington, D.C. in 2003. From 2004 to 2016, he was the director of the Markets, Trade, and Institutions Division at IFPRI. He also led the Global Research Program on Institutions and Infrastructure for Market Development and was the director for Latin America. Between 2016 and 2018, he served as the executive director for Argentina, Bolivia, Chile, Paraguay, Peru and Uruguay at the World Bank Group in Washington, D.C.

Torero was the chief of party for a US$449.6 million investment (2007-2012) by the Millennium Challenge Corporation (MCC) in rural infrastructure with a significant component of water and sanitation in El Salvador. The five-year investment consisted of three projects: connectivity project, human development project, and productive development project. The Connectivity Project included the Northern Transnational Highway (NTH) and the Network of Connecting Roads (NCR). Torero led the production of the reports, data and methodology with his team at IFPRI on El Salvador - Northern Transnational Highway.

Torero has worked on property rights, specifically urban and rural titling and crop choices. His work, cited in “The Mystery of Capital Deepens” (The Economist, August 24, 2006), shows that households with title were more likely to secure a loan from the government-backed Materials Bank.

He is a professor on leave at the University of the Pacific (Peru) and an Alexander von Humboldt Fellow at University of Bonn, Germany.

Awards and honours
Torero is the recipient of the Ford Foundation Fellowship, the Inter-American Development Bank Fellowship, and Fulbright Program Fellowship. He also received 1997-1998 Ford Foundation ISOP Interdisciplinary Program for Students of Development Areas, University of California Dissertation Year Fellowship; in 2000, he received the Georg Foster Research Fellowship of the Alexander von Humboldt Foundation.

He has won the World Award for Outstanding Research on Development given by the Global Development Network twice. In 2000, Maximo Torero and Javier Escobal won the award for their joint work on the geographical dimension of development, with the work titled “How to Face An Adverse Geography:The Role of Private and Public Assets”, Javier Escobal and Maximo Torero, GRADE (Outstanding Research on Development Award 2000).
Torero received the Chevalier de l'Ordre du Mérite Agricole in 2014.

Select publications
Journal articles and book chapters

 Mitra Sandip, Dilip Mookherjee, Sujata Visaria, and Maximo Torero. Asymmetric Information and Middleman Margins: An Experiment with West Bengal Potato Farmers. The Review of Economics and Statistics, MIT Press, vol. 100(1), pp. 1–13, March 2018.
 Manuel Barron and Maximo Torero. Household electrification and indoor air pollution. Journal of Environmental Economics and Management, Volume 86, 2017:81-92.
 Sandip Mitra, Dilip Mookherjee, Maximo Torero, and Sujata Visaria. Asymmetric Information and Middleman Margins: An Experiment with Indian Potato Farmers.vol. 100(1),2017:1-13
 Carlos Martins-Filho, Feng Yao, and Maximo Torero. Nonparametric Estimation of Conditional Value-at-risk and Expected Shortfall Based on Extreme Value Theory. Econometric Theory, 2018, vol. 34 (1):23–67.
 Alberto Chong, Isabelle Cohen, Erica Field, Eduardo Nakasone, and Maximo Torero. 2016. Iron Deficiency and Schooling Attainment in Peru. American Economic Journal: Applied Economics, 8(4): 222–55.

Books
 Devaux, André, ed.; Torero, Maximo, ed.; Donovan, Jason, ed.; and Horton, Douglas E., ed. 2016. Innovation for inclusive value-chain development: Successes and challenges. Washington, D.C.: International Food Policy Research Institute (IFPRI).
 Kalkuhl, Matthias, ed.; von Braun, Joachim, ed.; and Torero, Maximo, ed. 2016. Food price volatility and its implications for food security and policy. Cham, Switzerland: Springer.

References

1967 births
Living people
21st-century Peruvian economists
People from Lima
University of the Pacific (Peru) alumni
University of California, Los Angeles alumni